South Nanaimo was an electoral district in the Canadian province of British Columbia in the 1894, 1898 and 1900 elections only.

For other historical and current ridings named Nanaimo or in the area of Nanaimo, British Columbia please see Nanaimo (electoral districts).

Demographics

Election results 
Note:  Winners of each election are in bold.

|-

|Labour
|Tully Boyce1
|align="right"|120 		
|align="right"|45.11%
|align="right"|
|align="right"|unknown

|- bgcolor="white"
!align="right" colspan=3|Total valid votes
!align="right"|266 
!align="right"|100.00%
!align="right"|
|- bgcolor="white"
!align="right" colspan=3|Total rejected ballots
!align="right"|
!align="right"|
!align="right"|
|- bgcolor="white"
!align="right" colspan=3|Turnout
!align="right"|%
!align="right"|
!align="right"|
|- bgcolor="white"
!align="right" colspan=7|1 Nominated by the Nanaimo Reform Club, which had been set up by the Opposition but was dominated by the Miners' and Mine-Labourers' Protective Association (MMLPA). The slate was described as "a labor ticket on a labor platform, but with outside support." (T.R. Loosmore, "The British Columbia Labor Movement and Political Action, 1878-1906", 1954, p. 67(2).)
|}
  	

|-
 
|Labour
|Ralph Smith2
|align="right"|193
|align="right"|78.46%
|align="right"|
|align="right"|unknown

|- bgcolor="white"
!align="right" colspan=3|Total valid votes
!align="right"|246
!align="right"|100.00%
!align="right"|
|- bgcolor="white"
!align="right" colspan=3|Total rejected ballots
!align="right"|
!align="right"|
!align="right"|
|- bgcolor="white"
!align="right" colspan=3|Turnout
!align="right"|%
!align="right"|
!align="right"|
|- bgcolor="white"
!align="right" colspan=7|2  Ran as a "Labour-Oppositionist, i.e. as a Labour candidate but with Opposition support (T.R. Loosmore, "The British Columbia Labour Movement and Political Action in British Columbia, 1879-1906", 1954, p. 92).
|}

|-

|Labour
|John Radcliffe3
|align="right"|225 	 	 	
|align="right"|47.47%
|align="right"|
|align="right"|unknown
|- bgcolor="white"
!align="right" colspan=3|Total valid votes
!align="right"|474
!align="right"|100.00%
!align="right"|
|- bgcolor="white"
!align="right" colspan=3|Total rejected ballots
!align="right"|
!align="right"|
!align="right"|
|- bgcolor="white"
!align="right" colspan=3|Turnout
!align="right"|%
!align="right"|
!align="right"|
|- bgcolor="white"
!align="right" colspan=7|3 N(I)LP candidate supported by Provincial Party. (See note 6.) His name was also spelled Ratcliff and Ratcliffe by the press.
|}

The riding was redistributed before the 1903 election.  Successor ridings were (roughly) Nanaimo City, Newcastle and The Islands.

External links

Former provincial electoral districts of British Columbia